Doborji or Do Borji may refer to:
 Do Borji, Fars
 Doborji, Kermanshah